Nosphistica tarokoensis is a moth in the family Lecithoceridae which is endemic to Taiwan.

References

Nosphistica
Endemic fauna of Taiwan
Moths of Taiwan
Moths described in 2002